Alaskan Women Looking for Love is an American reality television series that premiered on the TLC cable network, on October 6, 2013. The series focuses on six single women who live and work in Alaska, but travel to Miami, Florida to find love.

Episodes

Season 1 (2013)

References

External links
 

2010s American reality television series
2013 American television series debuts
2013 American television series endings
American dating and relationship reality television series
English-language television shows
TLC (TV network) original programming
Works about dwarfism
Women in Alaska
Women in Florida